Joseph Verner Reed Jr. (December 17, 1937 – September 29, 2016) was an American banker and diplomat. He served as United States Ambassador to Morocco from 1981 to 1985, and as Chief of Protocol of the United States from 1989 to 1991.

Early life
Joseph Verner Reed Jr. was born on December 17, 1937 in New York City. He was named after his father, Joseph Verner Reed (1902 - 1973). His paternal grandfather was Verner Zevola Reed (1863-1919). His mother was Permelia Pryor. He had a brother, Nathaniel Reed. and another brother Samuel Pryor Reed (1934-2005), manager at Engelhard Industries. He is also a descendant of Edward Doty (1599-1655), who emigrated to the United States on the Mayflower.

He grew up at Denbigh Farm in Greenwich, Connecticut and Corsair in Hobe Sound, Florida. He was educated at the Deerfield Academy, a private boarding school in Deerfield, Massachusetts, and graduated from Yale University, a private university in New Haven, Connecticut, in 1961.

Career
He started his career as Private Secretary to the President of the World Bank, Eugene "Gene" Robert Black, Sr. (1898-1992). He then served as Vice President and Assistant to the Chairman of the Chase Manhattan Bank, David Rockefeller, from 1963 to 1981.

In 1985, he became United States Deputy Permanent Representative to the Economic and Social Council of the United Nations. Two years later, in 1987, he became Under-Secretary-General of the United Nations for Political and General Assembly Affairs.

He was appointed by President Ronald Reagan to serve as United States Ambassador to Morocco from 1981 to 1985. He was then appointed by President George H. W. Bush to serve as the Chief of Protocol of the United States from 1989 to 1991.

He returned to the UN, serving as Under-Secretary-General of the United Nations and Special Representative for Public Affairs from 1992 to 1997. From 1997 to 2004, he served as President of the Staff-Management Coordination Committee of the UN. In January 2005, he was appointed as Under-Secretary-General and Special Adviser. He was re-appointed as such in 2009. He was a member of the Council on Foreign Relations.
 
He was the recipient of the Legion of Honour. He also received The Yale Medal from his alma mater, Yale University.

Personal life
He married Marie Maude Byers, daughter of J. Frederic Byers (1939–1977) of Philadelphia, with whom they had two daughters, Serena (Reed) Kusserow and Electra Reed.

Reed died at Greenwich Hospital in Greenwich, Connecticut on September 29, 2016.

References

External links

1937 births
2016 deaths
Businesspeople from New York City
People from Greenwich, Connecticut
People from Hobe Sound, Florida
Deerfield Academy alumni
Yale University alumni
World Bank people
JPMorgan Chase people
Ambassadors of the United States to Morocco
American officials of the United Nations
Recipients of the Legion of Honour
Chiefs of Protocol of the United States
20th-century American businesspeople